Oxydemeton-methyl is an organothiophosphate insecticide.  It is primarily used to control aphids, mites, and thrips.

References

External links 
 

Acetylcholinesterase inhibitors
Organothiophosphate esters
Organophosphate insecticides
Sulfoxides
Methyl esters